The Newsreader is an Australian television drama series created by Michael Lucas, broadcast on ABC. The six-part series, exploring the personal and professional lives of journalists and crew within a 1980s Australian newsroom, premiered on 15 August 2021. It was ABC's most-watched drama programme of 2021, received positive reactions from critics, and achieved the most nominations of any show or film at the 11th AACTA Awards. In March 2022, it was renewed for a second season, for broadcast in the second half of 2023.

Cast

Main
 Anna Torv as Helen Norville, the first female newsreader of the ratings-dominant News at Six. Coming to the position in a time of misogyny and sexism sets up roadblocks in her career, especially as her fragile mental health begins to worsen, and charts a journey of recovery by leaping head-first into a relationship with junior reporter Dale.
 Robert Taylor as Geoff Walters, the long-time co-anchor of the News at Six, who is critical of Helen's position, believing it to be a part of the news genre's move towards entertainment and glamour to retain viewers. As a result, he feels he is being pushed out, as part of the old guard, and lets his health suffer as he perseveres on, resolved to not let that happen.
 Sam Reid as Dale Jennings, a junior reporter for News at Six whose eagerness to helm a bulletin sees him become Helen's producer, and the two become romantically involved - to the receptive eyes of the media - as he becomes concerned over his private life, and his personal secrets, potentially leaking onto the screen.
 William McInnes as Lindsay Cunningham, the overbearing, easily irascible, casually bigoted, and ratings-obsessed head of the News at Six newsroom.
 Marg Downey as Evelyn Walters, Geoff's wife, who diligently manages his career off-screen, often to his irritation.
 Stephen Peacocke as Rob Rickards, the sports editor, and former VFL player, for News at Six who struggles when temporarily promoted to co-anchor/relief anchor. He often asks Noelene for help and is oblivious to the fact that this is unpaid and uncredited work. As he becomes attracted to her, he appreciates her more.
 Chai Hansen as Tim Ahern, one of the News at Six cameramen who develops a crush on Dale.
 Michelle Lim Davidson as Noelene Kim, the assiduous News at Six library researcher and autocue operator, determined to try and make her mark.
 Chum Ehelepola as Dennis Tibb, the meticulously-working and hot-headed head producer of the newsroom.

Supporting and notable guests
 Maude Davey as Val Jennings, Dale's attentive and doting mother, keen to see her son do well, aware of his past traumas.
 Caroline Lee as Jean, the newsroom secretary.
 Bert La Bonté as Gordon, News at Six director and camera operator.
 Maria Angelico as Cheryl Ricci, News at Six make-up artist.
  John Leary as Murray, News at Six operator.
 Jackson Tozer as Ross, co-cameraman to Tim.
 Dom Phelan as Brett, the other sports editor for News at Six.
 Robert Grubb as Dr. McCormack, who has Helen as one of her patients and regularly re-fills her sleeping pill prescription despite her increasingly somewhat flimsy excuses.
 Tony Rickards as Dr. Shaw, Geoff's doctor, who meets resistance from both him and Evelyn about what changes Geoff must make to improve his health, his recommendations for a long while off-screen to recover are not well-received.
 Tim Draxl as Adam, a former schoolfriend of Dale's, who aims to apologise for a brutal event in their shared past.
 Edwina Wren as Cathy Norville, Helen's sister, who pleads with her to join the family in their father's dying days.

Episodes

Series overview

Series 1 (2021)

Series 2 (2023)
Set across 1987 and 1988, the series will revolve around Dale and Helen "contending with rising public profiles, intensifying office politics, and a ruthless new CEO [of the network]." The series will consist of six episodes. News events covered in the series include the 1987 federal election, the stock market crash, the separation of Prince Charles and Diana Spencer, the heroin crisis, and the Hoddle Street shootings. A trailer was released on 24 November 2022.

In February 2023, it was confirmed the series will air in the second half of 2023.

Production

Series 1
The series was created by Michael Lucas and Joanna Werner and was directed by Emma Freeman. Filmed in Melbourne, the series was written by Michael Lucas, Jonathan Gavin, Niki Aken and Kim Ho. Joanna Werner and Stuart Menzies, along with Brett Sleigh and Sally Riley on behalf of the ABC, executive produced the series. The series was supported through investments from Screen Australia and Film Victoria.

Initial development
The inception of what would become The Newsreader was worked on by Michael Lucas following his six-part series Party Tricks in 2014/2015 - and had a "long gestation" period. Initial writing for the series - which took place "immediately after" Lucas finished working on the fifth series of Offspring in 2015 - was not centred around a newsroom setting, but more simply to write about a male lead yearning to "fulfil" a "particular version of masculinity" that "wasn't an actual fit but he was just desperate to live up to it," a theme Lucas said was based on his own life experiences. This became the character of Dale, before Lucas realised there needed to be a female character to match him with, who would be "possessed of those traditional masculine qualities" instead; she would be "punished for them, whereas he struggles to fit into that masculine ideal." Lucas said the way in which the two characters flipped gender stereotypes was what he "found really compelling about them." Their relationship formed the basis of the series, with the additional layer of a 1980s setting decided upon due to the fact it would impose "more pressure on [the characters] to fulfil certain roles". Lucas then embarked on a year-and-a-half development timeframe, considering what "image of masculinity" the character of Dale would want to achieve, and chose newsreader - and a newsroom as the setting for the series - within a few drafts, Lucas calling them "lions" and "voice-of-God men".

Over the course of 2015 and 2016, Lucas began researching newsrooms of the 1980s, interviewing those who worked in them at the time and being struck by stories of the culture. Lucas was drawn to learning how female newsreaders - who were a relatively nascent arrival in the 1980s - coped in an environment that put so much pressure on them, caught in an "era of change". He claimed that they had to figure out how to "define how [they] should look in a workplace" and present themselves, as viewers still "liked hearing the news read by very masculine voices of God".

Lucas noted the significance of most of his research into the culture of newsrooms of the time being conducted prior to the #MeToo movement, recollecting, in an interview in 2021, how he questioned whether there would be a "profound change" that resulted from the movement, or whether society would have moved on by the time the show was broadcast. He lamented upon then-recent revelations about the culture in Parliament, and how "you realise we might have progressed in some ways, but there's still a lot of structural problems and a culture of bullying and misogyny linked to that." Lucas described the depth of research he undertook, potentially exaggerating as he claimed he "read nearly every newspaper from 1986", saying that letters to the editor were of great significance and useful, as "they give you the full picture of what people were making of things [then]."

Inclusion of real-life events

The first iteration of The Newsreader was written on spec, and a pilot was scripted, which Lucas approached ABC with, having worked with the network on sitcom Rosehaven. Lucas also considered taking the series to Foxtel, but thought the story would be a better fit for, and better told by, a non-commercial broadcaster; ABC responded positively "really quickly", and they had the added advantage of an extensive archive of news footage and coverage that could be used. Brett Sleigh at ABC - who would become an executive producer on the series - suggested using actual, famous events as the structure of the series, as it was previously just set around "generic stories" like the more expansive rollout of ATMs; Sleigh was enthusiastic about "making the most of ABC archives", and recommended Joanna Werner, to whom Lucas gave the draft pilot script and became "really connected with it" with "really clear vision about where it would go". Lucas said he immediately knew to start with the Challenger explosion, as that was the first major news event he remembered from childhood, while for the rest of the series picked events simply by looking at what happened during the first half of 1986, explicating that covering Chernobyl was unavoidable, but also that the series also covers less "date-specific" stories such as the HIV/AIDS epidemic.

From this, the decision was made to "tightly stick to a real-life timeframe", with episodes taking place over the course of only a few days at most. The crew received VHS tapes containing playouts of broadcast news bulletins on certain days, in order to judge the importance and prioritisation of certain news stories on the days episodes take place on. Freeman chose to signify to viewers as to specific dates on which events happened, which appear on screen at the start of each episode. Lucas, who was only experienced in writing "pure fiction", said that despite the somewhat "maddening" challenges that came with weaving in real-life events into the series, "following real events is what makes The Newsreader special", and it was a "fun puzzle" to "take those real life events and keep to the real dates, the real timeline," being aware of the "markers [you] have to hit", and simultaneously "weave fictional characters around them," to "take these real-life events that have their ebbs and flows that I can't change, and how that can provoke different relationships and turning points for the characters," and how to link them to elements of their personalities. He also claimed that the show does not entirely depend on those events being depicted, as regardless of whether viewers remember the events or not, the show allows for a "really interesting window into what those events were like and how newsrooms navigated them."

Discussing the process of writing the third episode, Lucas revealed that "at the plotting stage, [he would] go into the ABC archives, and take footage of the dates [he wanted]", watching The 7:30 Report or Mary Delahunty's news report, which "would all feed back into the story." Lucas was inspired by James Cameron's Titanic "as to how he placed his characters within the history of real events"; he described his approach through the example of how "[w]hen it comes to something like Lindy Chamberlain, they found the matinee jacket on this day, then on another day she was released from jail, then another she was back in Mt. Isa. So how do I manoeuvre my fictional characters around all of that to build a story?" He explained that the lack of date specificity, relative to the other events depicted in the show, meant he was able to place the (fifth) episode focusing on the AIDS crisis anywhere within the running order of the series, and was "deliberately positioned" as such "to get maximum emotional impact for the characters". Writing the show meant dealing with the balance between how to convey facts and emotions; Lucas said that the news story could be incredibly significant and prominent with set dates to operate in and around, so he "would have to think about what to do with the characters," whereas at "other times [he would] want to take characters to an emotional place".

Writing in general
Lucas wrote the series alone for a lengthy period of time while it was on spec, until he was able to form a writers' room around 2017. When he did, he hired those he knew would provide valuable roles to develop the programme, such as Niki Aken, who came from a research background, invited to be part of a "brainstorm" for the series, and wrote an outline (Aken remarked that her contributions to the programme were impacted by the pandemic, writing during the lockdown in Melbourne while in hotel quarantine in Sydney). Lucas also carried on a practice he engaged with during his roles on various programmes as a script co-ordinator, in finding and hiring an emerging writer, in this case Kim Ho; Lucas was impressed by his writing, with Ho asked to script coordinate and note-take, and the two co-wrote the fifth episode together. Debra Oswald also acted as script consultant for the series. 

The pandemic also afforded Lucas an extended period for development, with the start of pre-production delayed by four months, and spoke of him and production designer Melinda Doring taking advantage of that time, being able to collaborate further through Zoom meetings and using Dropbox folders to share and store potentially useful material; Doring sourced additional material from museums and online forums, with Lucas in awe of her dedication to the work and lamenting that he was unable to incorporate everything into the scripts. The delay also worked in Lucas' favour with his writing; his style is to "work intensely, go away and come back", to "pick it up fresh" after potentially "months away from it", having secured additional development funding and achieved a greater objectivity during the hiatus.

Lucas said the writing team were "bouncing back and forth", looking at the timeline and the characters, specifically where character arcs fit into the way in which the real-life events are depicted in the show. Before the writing of each episode, the research and archive footage "would be locked in", and only then would the writing progress onto working on the character arcs, so when a writer was assigned to an episode, a "comprehensive outline of the factual events involved would already be in place" to start with. Lucas spoke of how the "emotional arcs and storylines" were less set in stone in the run up to filming, and that they "tend[ed] to evolve a lot even within the timeline structure we had set" and that "was always an ongoing discussion up to and including being on set, and then even to a certain extent in the edit suite", that they "were still honing those emotional beats and moments."

Lucas claimed that he actively chose to "pare back" certain elements of newsrooms of the era that are looked back on negatively now, as he thought a "contemporary audience" would not approve if he "had directly translated" the sexism, racism, homophobia and misogyny that he had been informed were commonplace and institutionalised at the time. Lucas expanded on this, saying that there needed to be a balance between "be[ing] frank about the reality of it, but at the same time you don't want to traumatise viewers"; he chose to depict racism in a less explicit way, such as without use of racial epithets and employing how racism could be more subtle, using the example of the Korean character of Noelene being assumed to know how to translate Japanese, and that the other characters "have put in no effort to find out where her family have come from". He concluded that "[o]ur attempt is to show the full spectrum of that world and to depict the parts that were loaded with bullying and misogyny, and the parts that were exhilarating."

Commission and filming
Securing international distribution for the series proved troublesome at first. Prospective distributors were interested when shown scripts, but the "Australian specificity" of the series, as well as the era chosen for the period setting, made them hesitant. As a result, Lucas "became conscious of picking stories that have some international resonance", such as the Azaria Chamberlain case, covered in the third episode, which is a "quintessential Australian story, but means something overseas as well". Despite this, Werner spoke of how the accuracy with which they aimed to recreate the period setting was significant to "partners involved" in the series, describing how they took reference from movies in the late 1980s such as Tootsie and Working Girl to implement a neutral palette of "biege[s] and browns" in the show - what she deemed a "grounded approach", in contrast to the brash and bold colours in many depictions of the 1980s, invoking MTV music videos as one example, as "we wanted to look like [it was] made in the '80s - not a show made about the '80s". To accentuate this, cameras for filming were fitted with vintage lenses.

The series' commission was announced in April 2020, entered pre-production by October, with the casting announced that November; six episodes were ordered by ABC, despite the series being originally developed for eight.

The series was filmed over 54 shoot days during late 2020 and early 2021, under COVID-19 restrictions. As a result, plans for expansive location filming could not take place, such as being unable to film in Darwin, in the Northern Territory, for the third episode, which is partly set there, and instead restricted to the state of Victoria. Scenes in the episode, where Dale and Helen, among other journalists, are camped outside a house they believe Lindy Chamberlain is staying at, were filmed in Mildura, with many local residents having been chosen to portray extras and offered up the exterior of their homes to use for filming, which took place in March 2021. The scenes in the episode where Dale, Helen, Tim, Ross, and other assorted journalists and cameramen, are waiting outside Berrimah Prison for Lindy Chamberlain's release were also filmed in Mildura, with stills during the filming shot by Adrian Chiarella, husband to Lucas. Scenes in the fourth episode depicting the Russell Street bombing were filmed at the site of the bombing itself, Lucas commenting that the filming "shut down an entire city block"; Niki Aken, writer of the fourth episode, played an extra during the scenes in the aftermath of the bombing. Creator Lucas himself cameoed during the second episode, portraying a DJ at Geoff's birthday party; scenes for that were shot over three days, and commented that the experience of cameoing gave him the chance to become more accustomed with the cast. Filming of the News at Six studio was done at the NEP Studios in Southbank, South Melbourne, with the newsroom offices set in a disused chemical warehouse/factory in Brooklyn, west of Melbourne.

Creator Lucas and director Freeman worked closely and collaboratively on- and off-set, with clear roles set out for the two; during the writing process, Freeman provides Lucas with notes on the script from cast and other crew, and during her directing, he acts as "a support" for her on set. Lucas described Freeman as the "prime storyteller" on set, his presence to "help with speedbumps with the script or to troubleshoot". He later said that, the way in which he engages in constant communication with other cast members, with their input, during the process of writing and filming, that the series was a "mutual creation".

Casting and characterisation
Actress Marg Downey won the role of Evelyn Walters after she submitted an audition tape recorded at home, and that the first scene she shot was with William McInnes and filmed out-of-order, featuring early in the sixth episode. For Robert Taylor, a vocal coach from the era was hired, due to the need to "sharply define his vocal style, versus the more relaxed style ... he has". Chum Ehelopa claimed that when the show was pitched to him, he was unaware the show would revolve around real-life events.

Michelle Lim Davidson spoke of how the role of Noelene was adapted for her, and that she was hesitant to audition to play the part of a Korean woman due to concerns about whether Australian television was open to such representation; it was the first time she had auditioned to play the part of a Korean woman in her decade-long television career, and commented that she "never envisioned the day that [she] would play the first Korean Aus[tralian] woman in a major drama on Aus[tralian] TV". Lim Davidson spoke of the sense of jeong she felt on set of the family home of her character, and that she had "an overwhelming sense that [she] had arrived home", praising the "care and detailed accuracy of the Kim home" by the design, arts and props department - especially production designer Doring, and aided by writer/director and friend of hers, Undi Lee - and actress Hany Lee in helping her learn her Korean/Hangul dialogue. She said that she had "struggled with [her] Korean identity", her childhood and adolescence in Australia meaning she had not been "submerged in [her] cultural heritage", and how she felt she had been "running away from [her] cultural identity", expecting that she "wouldn't be able to find a safe space to be [her]self in the industry" and expressed her hopes her portrayal would lead to expanding Korean representation on television.

Anna Torv received the first two scripts of the series before she decided to take up the role, and was cast in early 2020. Torv wanted to ensure that she "truly represent[ed]" the female newsreaders of the time, and described her character as being an "amalgamation" of the female newsreaders she grew up watching every night, re-watching news coverage from the era to help finesse the development of the character. Torv reported how she invested "most of [her] energy into what it was to be a newsreader", including learning the significance of the autocue; her lines in scenes in which her character was delivering the news were read from an autocue. She discovered it was "the best way to perfect her delivery", realising "how connected the autocue was with the intonation and all the rest of it"; this appreciation was helped by partaking in sessions with someone who had been hired to teach the newsreading, and learned "that the phrasing, and all that kind of stuff, comes purely through the autocue" as the "way you speak as a newsreader is because you can't see the next word."

The process of developing the "texture of the character", according to Torv, "was everything you dream of ... as an actor". This stemmed from working with creator Lucas - whom Torv praised as "one of those incredibly beautiful and confident writers, and also confident creators, who sits at the table and is open", with whom "you feel like you're a part of the development," which she found "invigorating" as "it doesn't happen for actors all that often" - and producer Werner and director Freeman (who Torv has worked with before), saying that she "loved the collaboration" she was able to engage in with both, which was behind why she was so enthusiastic to be part of the show, acclaiming Freeman as "a brilliant director" who "creates such a fantastic environment for, like, play – honestly." Torv commented that "[m]aking The Newsreader was one of the most satisfying and joyous creative experiences that [she had] ever had". Torv also revealed that the ending of the series was not known from the beginning of production, and that the cast were only aware of the show's general direction for a time.

Historical accuracy
Some elements of the series have been observed to be lightly historically inaccurate. Lucas himself admitted the one thing he was "slightly playing with [was] the first visibility of Halley's Comet, which is a little bit compressed," which was picked up on by the ABC in an article wherein Matt Neal noted "the unlikely but dramatically convenient feat of seeing a brilliant and highly visible Halley's Comet in the Melbourne sky on February 1, 1986", as "[t]he optimal viewing time for Australia was in April," and citing the fever among the public surrounding the return of the comet being diluted at that time due to "the comet's distance from Earth and our planet's tilt meant it wasn't very bright, plus cloudy skies and light pollution meant city-dwellers' best chance to see the comet was with a telescope somewhere more rural." Neal also noted that a small claim in the first episode surrounding Melbourne Zoo's Butterfly House receiving its millionth visitor was dubious as it had only opened two months earlier and the Zoo itself "averages about 1.5 million visitors per year."

Neal and Flora Carr, from the UK's Radio Times, also wrote that the decision to call the Chernobyl disaster "the worst nuclear disaster ever" in the sixth episode may have been overly premature, and the positioning of the announcement of Prince Andrew and Sarah Ferguson's engagement was also compressed, featuring during the opening to the fourth episode, which was set over a week after the news was actually made public in reality.

Series 2 
On 30 March 2022, ABC confirmed that The Newsreader had been renewed for a second series, to be set in 1987.

Casting 
Alongside the confirmation of the series' renewal, it was revealed Daniel Gillies and Philippa Northeast had joined the cast. In July 2022, creator Lucas advertised on Twitter and Instagram for potential extras for a gay bar scene set to shoot in Melbourne in late August. Another casting call was made in July, for First Nations extras "to help recreate the 1988 Bicentennial Protests that were based in Fremantle and Sydney", suggesting series 2 will cover events in 1988.

A trailer was released in late November 2022, which also revealed that Rory Fleck Byrne would guest-star this series, as a variety show host. There will also be a further expansion of the cast with an introduction to extended family members of the main ensemble.

Production and filming 
In September 2021, before the first series was broadcast, when speaking about the prospect of a second series, Lucas claimed that he wanted to have sourced the required archive footage before starting writing, and how ABC's archives team had been proactive in doing this so he was already "sitting on a goldmine", and "brainstorming ideas [to be] ready when the time comes". Lucas later revealed that development of the second series was commissioned by ABC prior to the broadcast of the first, which gave him "time to imagine what I wanted and what the team wanted without knowing how people were going to respond", which he found "liberating" in that "you know who you're writing for", and he had the "ensemble's voices in [his] head".

Production and filming began in Melbourne in July 2022, as announced during the March 2022 announcement of the series 2 order. Filming for the second series lasted 56 days, over 11 weeks and ended in late September 2022.

The eighth week of filming involved the shooting of the newsdesk studio scenes, which were done back-to-back; the preference of director Freeman "to block [them] as one sequence" like a play, with cast "perform[ing] for six minutes at a time unbroken". Filming of such scenes means that the cast often shot eight or more pages a day, with the scenes shot using "full cinematic cameras" alongside "old Betacam cameras" - a mix of vintage and new technology - so as to render the footage resembling television of the 1980s. Lucas said that it was essentially a "functional newsdesk set".

Release
On 12 July 2021, the first trailer was released for the series. The series was broadcast on ABC, premiering on 15 August 2021. Alongside, and in the run-up to, the series' launch, the ABC released videos on YouTube and across social media interviewing cast and crew about the specific news events that would be covered in the series.

Entertainment One acquired international distribution rights to The Newsreader in late 2020, and has sold broadcast or streaming rights to the series to Arte in France and Germany, the BBC in the UK, Cosmo in Spain, Filmin in Portugal and Spain, NBCUniversal International Networks in Latin America, Now TV in Hong Kong, RTÉ in Ireland, The Roku Channel in the United States, Telus Presents in Canada, and Viaplay in Poland, the Netherlands and the Nordic and Baltic regions.

In Spain, the series premiered on 10 March 2022 on Cosmo, as part of their Women's Month programming, with the remaining episodes airing weekly, apart from the fifth and sixth airing together on 7 April 2022. In the United States, the series premiered on the Roku Channel on 18 March 2022, in New Zealand on Eden and on-demand platform ThreeNow on 24 March 2022, and in Brazil on Universal TV on 6 April 2022, with an earlier premiere of 30 March 2022, for subscribers of Universal+.

The show premiered in Mexico on 2 May 2022, on premium channel Universal Premiere and paid on-demand platforms. The series was subtitled "The Other Side of the News" (La otra cara de las noticias); the launch was commemorated by a special event of the same name on 11 May, that highlighted the "transformative role [female journalists] can perform [in] achiev[ing] gender equality in and out of the newsroom". It was helmed by Belén Sanz Luque, representative of the UN Women in Mexico, and attended by many experienced female Mexican journalists (including Paola Rojas, Denise Dresser, Pamela Cerdeira, Rossana Fuentes Berain, Bárbara Anderson and Adela Navarro). A photo exhibition and gallery featuring "prominent female journalists" was also featured at the Oasis Coyoacan Mall for the week following the event, in collaboration between Universal Plus and female-run media outlet Opinión 51.

In both the UK and Ireland, the show was made available on-demand in its entirety alongside a linear broadcast; in Ireland, it premiered on RTÉ2 on 7 June 2022 in a double-bill with all six episodes available on RTÉ Player after the first episode's broadcast, and in the United Kingdom premiered on BBC Two on 24 July 2022, with the entire series available from earlier that day on BBC iPlayer. The series was first made available in France and Germany by Arte on 26 January 2023 on-demand, with linear broadcasts starting on 2 February 2023.

Reception

Viewership 
The Newsreader was ABC's most-watched drama programme of 2021, achieving an average audience of 1.5 million viewers across linear and on-demand platforms. It was ABC's highest-rated new drama premiere of the year in the 25-54 age demographic.

In the UK on BBC2, the series opened with 620,000 viewers, with the entire series (broadcast in double-bills over three weeks) averaging 350,000 viewers among those watching the linear broadcast only; these figures are only of those who watched on the night of broadcast, and including those who watched in the seven days post-broadcast, the first episode rose to 1.1 million viewers, with each episode, on average across the six episodes, growing 133% from viewership on the night of broadcast after a week of catch-up. The show also became the channel's most-watched Sunday night drama in over four years, and was the most-watched new series across on-demand/streaming services of the public service broadcasters in the UK in the week post-launch. After 28 days, the first episode's viewership increased further to 1.4 million viewers. No viewership statistics, however, that include those who watched on-demand prior to linear broadcast, nor those seemingly including viewership on non-TV devices, have been publicly reported.

Critical reception

In Australia
The series was critically praised. The Guardians Luke Buckmaster, in a four-star review, praised Torv and Reid in "deliver[ing] fine performances as characters you want to keep spending time with, though you're not sure exactly why", the cinematography in lending the series a "placid and non-confronting tone, reflected in the graceful camerawork and scaled-back colour schemes", and the writing for "using real-life media stories as the scaffolding for character-related fiction, the former complementing the latter, without big-noting the subjects or rearranging history". He did, however, offer critique, opining that "the show is pretty toothless in terms of industry and cultural commentary", noting anachronistic diversity in representation of Australian newsrooms of the time; Helen Vatsikopoulos in The Canberra Times, who worked as a journalist during The Newsreaders temporal setting, also observed that newsrooms of the era "were not as diverse as the program pretends". Buckmaster then included The Newsreader in a list of the top 10 Australian television shows of 2021, ranking it ninth; he expanded on his opinion of the series further, saying it "has a slightly glossed-over vibe – evoking a feeling that some of the rough edges of history have been smoothed", but that the series is "crafted with a dignified sensibility and uses historical events as dramatic scaffolding", with "elegance of the show's compositions and the relatability of its well-developed characters keep[ing] it a pleasure to watch".

Karl Quinn, in a five-star review for The Sydney Morning Herald, called the series "brilliant" and a "terrific ensemble piece", "beautifully handled by director Emma Freeman" with "incisive, empathetic and funny scripts" by Lucas, concluding it was "the most fun [he'd] had watching telly in a long time." David Free, also in The Sydney Morning Herald, commented it was "the best show [he'd] seen in yonks", lavishing praise on the attention-to-detail in the series, in the clothes, language and propwork. However, Marama Whyte, in an article for History Australia journal, wrote that such details were relatively facile, saying "the period setting is style without much substance", as "[i]t wants the shoulder pads and typewriters, without engaging with the fact that this was an industry on the cusp of colossal change. It gives the distinct sense of being a setting chosen for aesthetics and convenience, rather than any reason directly related to the plot or argument."

International
Rachel Aroesti from The Guardian in the United Kingdom also wrote similarly, claiming that "it is hard to feel fully enveloped in The Newsreaders world", and despite its "news-heavy plotlines" holds a "generic backdrop that smoothes out the quirks of the period and the setting". On other matters, she lamented that the show appeared to "shrink away from its fascinating, disruptive female lead", with Torv and her character of Helen Norville more deserving of being the focus of the show. Nevertheless, she praised the leads as "brilliant", and how the series allows for a "trip down memory lane [that] complements a subtler, mysterious and slower-paced set of character-driven storylines", considering it "a classy, well-acted period drama" that "is excellent at capturing the weird, restrained elation that a large-scale tragedy can bring to a newsroom ... and neatly sums up something decidedly murky about journalism in the process". James Croot for Stuff in New Zealand had similar thoughts, saying "for all Reid's ... understated impressiveness, this is really Torv's ... show. Looking almost like a dead ringer for Cate Blachett [sic], she delivers a performance of power, grit and authority that her more illustrious countrywoman would be proud of. In Torv's hands, maybe Helen Norville is actually Australia's answer to Murphy Brown or Mary Tyler Moore. Regardless of any such futile comparisons, she is what drives The Newsreader." Croot nevertheless called the show "excellent", claiming "what grounds the show ... and makes it compelling viewing – is the seemingly unlikely relationship between Helen and Dale [and that] [w]atching them combine and spark off one another during a key broadcast was potentially as enthralling as if it had been the real thing."

Most other reviews upon its premiere in the United Kingdom were largely positive. Carol Midgley, in The Times four-star review, also observed, and praised, the attention-to-detail with the features of the period setting, calling the series "nostalgic", while also commenting on "the quickfire writing" and "strong performances" in the series, calling it a "joy to watch" primarily due to Torv's "complex" performance as Helen "with fabulous nuance". Also in a four-star review, for the i newspaper, Rachael Sigee wrote that the show's two leads are "excellent", with "a strong ensemble cast", yet admitted there was "a slight soapiness to some elements of the plot", but that the "set-up lends itself to melodrama", and overall was a "fun but flinty story that revels in its 80s setting". Dan Einav, in another four-star review, in the Financial Times, also lauded Torv's performance and "organic rapport with Reid", stating that "what [the show] lacks in grand themes, [it] more than makes up for in the strength of the characterisations and performances".

Helen Hawkins of The Arts Desk, in her four-star review, noted the diversity of ethnic and cultural backgrounds of some of the characters, calling it "a mini melting pot that allows the script to probe the unattractive hidden currents of Australian corporate life", and that a strength of the show is "the unshowy way it goes about stirring this pot. There are no unearned crises or implausible twists. Life itself is left to provide those. The writing carves out niches for the characters inside the potential stereotypes, and the actors rise to it". She also wrote that the "period feel of the piece is masterfully done, a filter giving it a dingy look that accentuates the browns, beiges and dirty greens of the spot-on decor and fashions", and not in a way that is "screaming "Look how authentic we've made it!"", as well as that what "the script also gratifyingly gets right" is one of the underlying issues explored in the show of the "emergence of the data-driven approach ... at this stage, the data are the station's all-important ratings" with "[s]erious news ... doomed if the ratings say people don't watch it readily and want only entertainment."

In a positive review in Público, María José Arias wrote that "[t]he ins and outs of television and the journalism that is done in it are a universe as interesting as it is dynamic that, well planned and explored, can give way [to], true television jewels", and that The Newsreader "is a good example of how to do it", claiming the series' hook is its "ability to give a fast and agile rhythm to the drama ... without forgetting to take care of the details that make the viewer connect and empathize with what happens to their characters", adding "although it is still a drama, it has its touches of humour and hooks you from the first moment with its touch of romance and its plots of business politics". She spoke further of how the character of Geoff "perfectly embodies that old glory of journalism addicted to the spotlight and being in the limelight unable to retire ... to make way for new generations."

The series ranked fourth in Varietys top 13 list of The Best International TV Shows of 2021.

Response 
In response to criticism over the show's perceived misunderstanding of the level of diversity and minority representation in newsrooms of the time, Chum Ehelepola responded on Instagram, writing:

Awards 
At the 11th AACTA Awards, the show was nominated for more awards than any other program.

References

External links

 on ABC iview 

The Newsreader at Werner Film Productions

2021 Australian television series debuts
2020s Australian drama television series
2020s LGBT-related drama television series
Australian Broadcasting Corporation original programming
English-language television shows
Television productions postponed due to the COVID-19 pandemic
Television series about journalism
Television series about television
Television series set in the 1980s
Television series set in 1986